The Valley Raiders were a Minor League Baseball team that represented Valley, Alabama, Lanett, Alabama and West Point, Georgia. They played in the Georgia–Alabama League from 1946 to 1951 and were affiliated with the Boston Red Sox in 1948–1949.

External links
Baseball Reference

Baseball teams established in 1946
Sports clubs disestablished in 1951
Professional baseball teams in Alabama
Defunct Georgia-Alabama League teams
Boston Red Sox minor league affiliates
Defunct baseball teams in Alabama
Baseball teams disestablished in 1951